KCRS-FM (branded as 103.3 Kiss FM) is a radio station that serves the Midland–Odessa metropolitan area with Top 40 (CHR) music. The station is owned by ICA Broadcasting, a local company. They acquired the contract for $3 million in 2010 from Gap Broadcasting (whom acquired many stations including KCRS-FM from Clear Channel Communications), and its hosts are Danny G, Nate Rodrigez, and Ryan Seacrest.  Its studios are located at the ICA Business Plaza on East Eighth Street in Odessa, just east of downtown, and its transmitter is located in Gardendale, Texas.

References

External links

CRS-FM
Contemporary hit radio stations in the United States
Radio stations established in 1976